Life in the Sugar Candle Mines is the debut album by Black Host, a free jazz quintet led by drummer Gerald Cleaver, who is joined by alto saxophonist Darius Jones, guitarist Brandon Seabrook, pianist Cooper-Moore and bassist Pascal Niggenkemper. It was released in 2013 on the Northern Spy label.

Reception

The Down Beat review by Areif Sless-Kitain notes that "the drummer’s credit for 'sound design' hints at his ringleader role, yet Cleaver functions more as a conduit than a featured player."

In his review for JazzTimes Steve Greenlee states "Anyone who still thinks free jazz is unpleasant random noises needs to hear Life in the Sugar Candle Mines, 78 minutes of loosely structured but highly conceived music by some of the best in the avant-garde game."

Track listing
All compositions by Gerald Cleaver except as indicated
 "Hover" – 16:10
 "Ayler Children" – 11:23 
 "Citizen Rose" – 8:04
 "Test-Sunday" – 6:35
 "Amsterdam / Frames" (Jones/Seabrook/Ashton/Niggenkemper/Cleaver) – 6:01
 "Gromek" – 12:58
 "Wrestling" (Béla Bartók) – 5:59
 "May Be Home" – 10:28

Personnel
Darius Jones - alto sax
Brandon Seabrook – guitar
Cooper-Moore – piano, synth
Pascal Niggenkemper – bass
Gerald Cleaver - drums, sound design

References

External links
Gerald Cleaver: Surrendering to the Experience, by Troy Collins at Point of Departure

2013 albums
Gerald Cleaver (musician) albums
Northern Spy Records albums